Addi Qenafiz is a reservoir located in the Hintalo Wajirat woreda of the Tigray Region in Ethiopia. The earthen dam that holds the reservoir was built in 1998 by SAERT.

Dam characteristics 
 Dam height: 15.5 metres
 Dam crest length: 514 metres
 Spillway width: 10 metres

Capacity 
 Original capacity: 670 480 m³
 Dead storage: 60953 m³
 Reservoir area: 12.86 ha
In 2002, the life expectancy of the reservoir (the duration before it is filled with sediment) was estimated at 31 years.

Irrigation 
 Designed irrigated area: 60 ha
 Actual irrigated area in 2002: 7 ha

Environment 
The catchment of the reservoir is 14.18 km² large, with a perimeter of 17 km and a length of 5360 metres. The reservoir suffers from rapid siltation. The geology of the catchment is Mekelle Dolerite, Agula Shale, and, at the upper edge, the Amba Aradam Formation. Part of the water that could be used for irrigation is lost through seepage; the positive side-effect is that this contributes to groundwater recharge.

References 

1998 establishments in Ethiopia

Reservoirs in Ethiopia
Tigray Region